The 2000 Davidson Wildcats football team represented Davidson College as an independent during the 2000 NCAA Division I-AA football season. It was the program's 102nd season overall but their first with an undefeated record. Davidson was led by first-year head coach Joe Susan, who was named the FCS Mid-Major Coach of the Year.

Schedule

Awards and honors
FCS Mid-Major All-America First Team – Ryan Crawford (The Football Gazette); Bryan Fish (The Football Gazette); Bo Henderson (The Football Gazette)
FCS Mid-Major All-America Second Team – Corey Crawford (The Football Gazette)
FCS Mid-Major Defensive Back of the Year – Ryan Crawford (The Football Gazette)
FCS Independent Defensive MVP – Ryan Crawford
FCS Mid-Major Coach of the Year – Joe Susan (The Football Gazette)
FCS Independent Coach of the Year – Joe Susan

References

Davidson
Davidson Wildcats football seasons
College football undefeated seasons
Davidson Wildcats football